Dyangadi is a possible small family of extinct or nearly extinct Australian Aboriginal languages of New South Wales:

Nganyaywana  Anaiwan
Dyangadi a.k.a. Burgadi

They were once included among the Kuric languages.

However, Bowern (2011) retains Dyangadi in Kuric, removing only Nganyaywana as a separate Anewan branch.

Footnotes

References
Dixon, R. M. W. (2002). Australian Languages: Their Nature and Development. Cambridge University Press.
Bowern, Claire. 2011. How Many Languages Were Spoken in Australia?

Extinct languages of New South Wales